Toni Kanaet (born 4 September 1995) is a Croatian taekwondo practitioner. He won the gold medal at the 2018 European Taekwondo Championships on the - 74 kg weight category.

References

External links
 

1995 births
Croatian male taekwondo practitioners
Living people
Sportspeople from Split, Croatia
European Taekwondo Championships medalists
Taekwondo practitioners at the 2020 Summer Olympics
Medalists at the 2020 Summer Olympics
Olympic taekwondo practitioners of Croatia
Olympic bronze medalists for Croatia
Olympic medalists in taekwondo
21st-century Croatian people